Crull's Island is a  alluvial island in the upper Allegheny River.  It is located in Pleasant Township, Warren County, Pennsylvania, and is part of the Allegheny Islands Wilderness in Allegheny National Forest.

The lower third of Crull's Island was briefly farmed, but was abandoned when it proved to be unprofitable.  It is now a prime location for old growth, virgin, and river bottom forests.  The forests contain Silver Maple, Sugar Maple, American Sycamore, and Slippery Elm.

See also
List of old growth forests

References
Nature Tourism

Allegheny Islands Wilderness
Old-growth forests
Landforms of Warren County, Pennsylvania
River islands of Pennsylvania
Islands of the Allegheny River in Pennsylvania